Nowbaran District is a district (bakhsh) in Saveh County, Markazi Province, Iran. At the 2006 census, its population was 20,430, in 6,470 families.  The district has two cities: Nowbaran and Gharqabad. The district has three rural districts (dehestan): Aq Kahriz Rural District, Bayat Rural District, and Kuhpayeh Rural District.

References 

Saveh County
Districts of Markazi Province